Monument is a Tyne and Wear Metro station, serving the Monument area of the city of Newcastle upon Tyne in Tyne and Wear, England. It joined the network on 15 November 1981, following the opening of the third phase of the network, between Haymarket and Heworth. The station is named after Grey's Monument, which stands directly above it.

History 
The station opened with services from the lower level platforms (1 and 2) commencing on 15 November 1981, when the line was extended south from the temporary terminus at Haymarket to Heworth.

The remaining two platforms on the upper level (3 and 4) opened when services between Tynemouth and St James via Wallsend commenced on 14 November 1982.

The engineers had to build better supports for the monument.

Facilities 
The ticket hall has a number of exits, including into the Fenwick department store, Eldon Square, Blackett Street and Grey Street.

The ticket hall additionally contains its own shops including a branch of Sainsbury's Local. The station previously housed a Nexus TravelShop which closed in 2015. In 2019 work was underway to convert the former TravelShop into the country's first underground bar, The Waypoint.

Services 
, services operate at the following frequency:

Platform 1 and 2 are served by up to ten trains per hour on weekdays and Saturday, and up to eight trains per hour during the evening and on Sunday.

Platform 3 and 4 are served by up to five trains per hour on weekdays and Saturday, and up to four trains per hour during the evening and on Sunday.

Rolling stock used: Class 599 Metrocar

Layout
, it is one of only three stations in the world where the same line passes through the same station twice in a pretzel configuration. Other stations using this layout are Voorweg on the RandstadRail network in The Hague, Netherlands, and Serdika and Serdika II on the Sofia Metro in Sofia, Bulgaria. A similar layout also existed on the Vancouver SkyTrain in Vancouver, British Columbia, Canada at Commercial–Broadway between 2002 and 2016.

Trains departing from platform 1 and platform 3 both state South Shields as their destination. However, trains from platform 3 they must first complete an anti-clockwise circuit, running via Wallsend, Whitley Bay and South Gosforth. The journey time to South Shields is considerably shorter when departing from platform 1 (28 minutes), rather than platform 3 (82 minutes).

Art
The station features some art installations. By one of the entrances is a mural, Famous Faces, created by Bob Olley. It features a number of famous people from the North East, looking out of the window of a train. This is mentioned on the song By the Monument by the band Maxïmo Park, who grew up in the area.

Outside the station, a simple ventilation shaft has been disguised by Parsons Polygon. Created by David Hamilton as a tribute to Sir Charles Parsons. It is made from clay and features abstract designs based on Parsons' engineering drawings. There are also some designs based on circuitry which have been sand-blasted into the walls and paving of the entrances to the station. This was installed in 2002 and is entitled Circuit. It was created by Richard Cole.

Gallery

Notes

References

External links
 
 Train times and station information for Monument

Railway stations in Great Britain opened in 1981
Railway stations located underground in the United Kingdom
Transport in Newcastle upon Tyne